The Diocese of Joliet in Illinois is a Latin Church ecclesiastical territory, or diocese, of the Catholic Church in the state of Illinois in the United States.  The Diocese of Joliet in Illinois is a suffragan diocese in the ecclesiastical province of the metropolitan Archdiocese of Chicago.  The mother church is the Cathedral of St. Raymond Nonnatus.

The current bishop of Joliet is Ronald Hicks.

Territory 
The Diocese of Joliet comprises the City of Joliet in Illinois and its surrounding counties: 

DuPage, Ford, Grundy, Iroquois, Kankakee, Kendall and Will.

History

Early history 
During the 17th century, present day Illinois was part of the French colony of New France. The Diocese of Quebec, which had jurisdiction over the colony, sent numerous French missionaries to the region. After the British took control of New France in 1763, the Archdiocese of Quebec retained jurisdiction in the Illinois area. In 1776, the new United States claimed sovereignty over the area of Illinois. In 1785, Archbishop John Carroll of the Archdiocese of Baltimore, then having jurisdiction over the entire United States, sent his first missionary to Illinois. In 1787, the area became part of the Northwest Territory of the United States.

With the creation of the Diocese of Bardstown in Kentucky in 1810, supervision of the Illinois missions shifted there. In 1827, the new bishop of the Diocese of St. Louis assumed jurisdiction in the new state of Illinois.  In 1834, the Vatican erected the Diocese of Vincennes, which included both Indiana and Illinois. With the creation of the Diocese of Chicago in 1843, all of Illinois was transferred there from the Diocese of Vincennes.

The construction of the Illinois and Michigan Canal in northeast Illinois during the 1830's and 1840's attracted many Irish Catholic  immigrants into the Joliet area. The diocese assigned Reverend John Plunkett to minister to the workers. He established St. Patrick Church as the first church in the Joliet area. With the industrialization of Illinois and the emergence of Chicago as an important center of commerce for the nation, the new churches and missions in the Joliet area flourished.  Its congregants were mostly newly arrived immigrant laborers from Europe and several generations of local farmers.

Diocese of Joliet 
In 1948, Pope Pius XII established the Diocese of Joliet, removing its territory from the Archdiocese of Chicago, to meet the demands of the exponential growth of Catholicism in the region. He named Reverend Martin McNamara of the Archdiocese of Chicago as the first bishop.  McNamara selected St. Raymond's church as the cathedral.  By 1950, the 540-seat church proved inadequate and he began planning a new facility.  He consecrated the new Cathedral of St. Raymond Nonnatus on May 26, 1955. In 1985, Pope Paul VI appointed Romeo Blanchette of the Archdiocese of Chicago as an auxiliary bishop in Joliet. 

After McNamara died in 1966, Paul VI appointed Blanchette as the second bishop of Joliet. He served as bishop until 1979, resigning due to health issues. Blanchette's replacement, Auxiliary Joseph Imesch of the Archdiocese of Detroit, was named by Pope John Paul II.  Soon after arriving in Joliet, Imesch worked with other community leaders to create the Daybreak Shelter for the homeless.  Every month, Imesch would visit the shelter to serve meals and converse with its clients.  He started the first Diocesan Annual Appeal in 1986 and in 1996 founded the Joliet Diocesan Catholic Education Foundation.  Imesch started a sister relationship with the Diocese of Sucre in Bolivia, helping build and staff a hospital there.

With Imesch's retirement in 2006, Pope Benedict XVI named Bishop J. Peter Sartain of the Diocese of Little Rock as the next bishop of Joliet. Four years later, Benedict XVI appointed him as archbishop of the Archdiocese of Seattle.  His replacement in 2011 was Bishop Robert Conlon of the Diocese of Steubenville.  Conlon took a medical leave in 2019 and then resigned the next year. 

Pope Francis in 2020 named Auxiliary Bishop Ronald Hicks of the Archdiocese of Chicago as the next bishop of the Diocese of Joliet.  Hicks is the current serving bishop of the diocese.

Reports of sex abuse
In September 2012, Bishop Conlon created a controversy by reinstating F. Lee Ryan, a diocese priest, to ministry for homebound parishioners. The diocese had suspended Ryan in 2010 from St. Edmund Parish in Watseka, Illinois, and St. Joseph Mission in Crescent City, Illinois, because it had determined a sexual abuse allegation against Ryan from the 1970's was credible.  According to The Huffington Post, Conlon ruled that since child molestation was not a serious crime under canon law in the 1970s, the diocese could only limit Ryan in ministry and not remove him completely.  After dealing with large opposition within the diocese to this decision, Conlon reversed himself on September 18, 2012, and permanently removed Ryan from ministry.

In a 2015 lawsuit brought against the diocese by sexual abuse victims, it was revealed that Bishop Blanchette ignored warnings about the behavior of certain seminarians. The diocese settled with the victims for over $4 million.

 He allowed the ordination of Lawrence Gibbs in 1973, despite complaints about his behavior from administrators at Saint Mary of the Lake Seminary.  Gibbs eventually molested 14 boys.
 Blanchette allowed James Nowak to be ordained, despite knowing that the Capuchin Order had dismissed him due to his failure to keep his vow of chastity.  Nowak eventually abused eight children. 

A list released by the diocese in August 2018 revealed the names of 35 clergy who served in the diocese during a 70-year period and were "credibly accused" of sex abuse. On August 31, 2018, it was announced that the diocese had agreed to pay $1.3 million to three males who claimed they had been sexually abused in the diocese during the early 1980s.

On October 31, 2019, Conlon and the Diocese of Joliet were named in a $100,000 sexual abuse lawsuit. The defendant was a developmentally disabled man who had been sexually assaulted in 2017 at the Shapiro Developmental Center in Kankakee, Illinois. The assailant, Father Richard Jacklin, was arrested for the assault. The lawsuit charged the diocese and Conlon with improper vetting of Jacklin's background and negligent supervision of him.

Bishops

Bishops of Joliet in Illinois
 Martin Dewey McNamara (Dec 17, 1948, – May 23, 1966)
 Romeo Roy Blanchette (Jul 19, 1966, – Jan 30, 1979)
 Joseph Leopold Imesch (Jun 30, 1979, – May 16, 2006)
 James Peter Sartain (May 16, 2006, – Sep 16, 2010), appointed Archbishop of Seattle
 Robert Daniel Conlon (May 17, 2011, – May 4, 2020)
 Ronald A. Hicks (07.17.2020–present)

Auxiliary Bishops
Romeo Roy Blanchette (Feb 8, 1965, – Jul 19, 1966), appointed Bishop of Joliet
Raymond James Vonesh (Jan 5, 1968, – May 7, 1991)
Daniel Kucera, OSB (Jun 6, 1977, – Mar 5, 1980), appointed Bishop of Salina and later Archbishop of Dubuque
Daniel L. Ryan (Aug 14, 1981, – Nov 22, 1984), appointed Bishop of Springfield in Illinois
Roger Kaffer (Apr 25, 1985, – Aug 15, 2002)
James Edward Fitzgerald (Jan 11, 2002, – Jun 5, 2003)
Joseph M. Siegel (Oct 28, 2009, – Oct 18, 2017), appointed Bishop of Evansville

Apostolic Administrators
Richard E. Pates (Dec 27, 2019, – Jul 17, 2020)

Major Churches
 Cathedral of St. Raymond Nonnatus
 National Shrine of Mary Immaculate Queen of the Universe, Lombard
National Shrine of Saint Thérèse, Darien

High schools
 Benet Academy, Lisle
 Bishop McNamara High School, Kankakee
 Chesterton Academy of the Holy Family, Lisle
 IC Catholic Prep, Elmhurst
 Joliet Catholic Academy, Joliet
 Montini Catholic High School, Lombard
 Providence Catholic High School, New Lenox
 St. Francis High School, Wheaton

References

External links

Cathedral of Saint Raymond Nonnatus
Parishes of the Diocese of Joliet
Catholic Hierarchy.org
GCatholic.org

 
1948 establishments in Illinois
Christian organizations established in 1948
Crest Hill, Illinois
Culture of Joliet, Illinois
Joliet in Illinois
Joliet